Johannes de Graaff (1729–1813), also referred to as Johannis de Graeff in some documents, was a Dutch Governor of Sint Eustatius, Saba and Sint Maarten in the Netherlands Antilles during the difficult time of the American Revolutionary War.

Life and career
De Graaff was born in Sint Eustatius, the son of Simon de Graaff', a member of the island council. De Graaff received his education in the Netherlands. After he returned to Sint Eustatius, he married Maria Heyliger, a daughter of the ruling Commander (Governor) Abraham Heyliger. De Graaff started his career as a military commander of Sint Maarten and, after his wife's death, on 5 September 1776 he was made Commander (or Governor in every day parlance) of Sint Eustatius.

"First Salute" to the American Flag

Sint Eustatius was the most important place for dealing or smuggling with Americans. On 16 November 1776, at the beginning of the American Revolutionary War, the American navy ship USS Andrew Doria, with the American Declaration of Independence on board, arrived in St. Eustatius. Its captain fired a salute to the Dutch flag on Fort Oranje and Johannes de Graaff decided to answer the salute with eleven gunshots. And so the United States of America were for the first time recognized as a nation by this salute of eleven guns.

The British were furious and De Graaff was recalled to the Netherlands following British protests to the Dutch government. He explained his motivations and was sent back to Sint Eustatius.

Loss of island

De Graaff held his position until admiral Rodney, leading a large naval force, captured the island in February 1781.

Commentaries regarding the 'First Salute'
"White puffs of gun smoke over a turquoise sea followed by the boom of cannon rose from the unassuming port on the diminutive Dutch island of St. Eustatius in the West Indies on 16 November 1776. The guns of Fort Orange on St. Eustatius were returning the ritual salute on entering a foreign port of an American vessel, the Andrew Doria, as she came up the roadstead, flying at her mast the red-and-white-striped flag of the Continental Congress. In its responding salute, the small voice of St. Eustatius was the first to officially greet the largest event of the century – the entry into the society of nations of a new Atlantic state destined to change the direction of history".

In 1939, President Roosevelt presented a plaque to St. Eustatius. Mounted on the flagpole inside the impressively restored Fort Oranje, it reads, "In commemoration of the salute to the flag of the United States fired in this fort on 16 November 1776 by order of Johannes de Graaff, Governor of St. Eustatius in reply to a national gun salute fired by the U.S. Brig-of-war Andrew Doria.(...) Here the sovereignty of the United States was first formally acknowledged to a national vessel by a foreign official".

External links
 (nl) Article in the NIMH 1713–1795:in de achterhoede, De Graaff under 1776: Het Doria saluut 
 (eng) First Foreign Salute to the American flag, Article about Johannes de Graaff in the New York Times
 (eng) Article about Johannes de Graaff in History of Holland 
 (eng) De Graaff in The story of New Netherland
 Newspaper article (Johannes de Graeff / Op den Graeff coonection
 (eng) Information about portrait of Johannes de Graaff in the New Hampshire Statehouse

Notes

1729 births
1813 deaths
18th-century Dutch colonial governors
Dutch West India Company people
Lieutenant Governors of Sint Eustatius